Bonamia erecta is a shrub in the family Convolvulaceae.

It is found on sandplains in the Mid West, Goldfields-Esperance, Gascoyne and Pilbara regions of Western Australia where it grows in red sandy soils.

References

erecta
Plants described in 1987